Plato was the Exarch of Ravenna from 645 to 649. He is known primarily for his monothelitism, as well as for his opposition to Pope Theodore I, whom he convinced Patriarch Paul II of Constantinople to break with.

He is first attested as exarch in 645. By 649, when his successor Olympius is named as being at Ravenna, he was already back at the imperial court in Constantinople, functioning as the advisor of Emperor Constans II on the Italian situation regarding Pope Martin I's resistance to Monotheletism.

He is last attested in 653. A brother, the presbyter Theocharistus, and a brother-in-law or son-in-law named Theodore Chilas, are also attested two years later.

Sources
 

7th-century exarchs of Ravenna
7th-century deaths
Patricii
Year of birth unknown